Catholicos Garegin II (also spelled Karekin; born 21 August 1951) is the current Catholicos of All Armenians, the supreme head of the Armenian Apostolic Church. In 2013 he was unanimously elected the Oriental Orthodox head of the World Council of Churches for the next eight years.

Biography
Garegin II was born as Ktrij Nersessian in Voskehat, Armenia, on 21 August 1951. He entered the Gevorkian Theological Seminary at Echmiadzin in 1965 and graduated with honours in 1971. He was ordained to the diaconate in 1970. Later he became a monk and was ordained a priest in 1972. In the late 1970s the Catholicos of that period encouraged him to study outside of Armenia. This led to him continuing his studies in Vienna, Bonn University, and Zagorsk, Russia. On 23 October 1983, he was consecrated bishop at Echmiadzin. He became an archbishop in 1992.

Garegin II speaks fluent German from his time in Germany and Austria.  In 1975 during his time in Cologne he was the spiritual representative of nine Armenian congregations in Germany.

In 1988 Garegin took an active role in helping his people overcome the Armenian earthquake. He oversaw the construction of a number of churches and schools in Armenia.  He also showed an interest in using modern technology and telecommunications to help the life of his churches as well as dealing with the legacies of the Soviet era.
 
On 27 October 1999 he was elected the 132nd Catholicos of All Armenians at the Mother See of Holy Etchmiadzin, succeeding Karekin I. His relations with Pope John Paul II were generally positive.  When the Pope visited Armenia in 2001, he stayed with the Catholicos.

In October 2007, he began a second visit to the United States.  On 10 October 2007, he offered the opening prayer for the day's session of the United States House of Representatives.

His ecumenical trip to India to meet Baselios Thoma Didymos I, Catholicos of the East in November 2008, helped strengthen relations between the Armenian and Indian Orthodox Churches.

The delegates to the 10th General Assembly of the World Council of Churches that took place in Busan, South Korea, on 4 November, unanimously elected Catholicos of All Armenians Garegin II, the supreme patriarch and head of the Armenian Apostolic Church, head of the organisation for the next eight years.

On 26 June 2016, Catholicos Garegin and Pope Francis signed a joint declaration on the family. It stated that the secularisation of society and its "alienation from the spiritual and divine" are damaging to the family, and affirmed that the Catholic and Armenian Apostolic churches share a marriage–based view of the family. The declaration also took note of various positive steps taken towards unity between the two leaders' churches, and "acknowledged the successful 'new phase' in relations" between them.  It also lamented "immense tragedy" of the widespread persecution of Christians in the Middle East; the Pope and the Catholicos prayed "for a change of heart in all those who commit such crimes and those who are in a position to stop the violence".

Awards
 Legion of Honour (France, 2001)
 Order of Friendship (Russia, 2006)
 Order of the Star of Romania
 Order of Prince Yaroslav the Wise (Ukraine, 2001)
 Order of St. Thomas (India, 2008)
 Honorary member of the Armenian National Academy of Sciences

References

External links
Website of the Armenian Church

Catholicoi of Armenia
1951 births
Living people
Armenian Oriental Orthodox Christians
Grand Crosses of the Order of the Star of Romania
University of Bonn alumni
People from Armavir Province
Gevorgian Seminary alumni
Soviet people